Llyn Ogwen is a ribbon lake in north-west Wales. It lies alongside the A5 road between two mountain ranges of Snowdonia, the Carneddau and the Glyderau.  Somewhat unusually, the county boundary at this point is drawn so that the lake itself lies in the county of Gwynedd, but all the surrounding land (excluding the outflow) lies in Conwy County Borough.

It is fed by a number of streams from the slopes of the mountains which surround it, which include Tryfan and Pen yr Ole Wen. The largest of these streams is Afon Lloer, which flows from Ffynnon Lloer.

It is said that after the Battle of Camlann (King Arthur's final battle), Sir Bedivere (Bedwyr) cast the sword Excalibur into Llyn Ogwen, where it was caught by the Lady of the Lake. Tryfan is said to be Sir Bedivere's final resting-place. According to the writer Jonah Jones:

Llyn Ogwen is the source of the Afon Ogwen which flows north to reach the sea near Bangor. A dam was built in the Afon Ogwen at Ogwen Bank, in the early 20th century, to raise the level of the river in order to provide water for the use in the nearby Penrhyn Quarry. The lake is popular with anglers and is said to contain excellent trout.

References

Geraint Roberts (1995) The Lakes of Eryri, Carreg Gwalch 

Capel Curig
Llanllechid
Ogwen
Ogwen
Ogwen
Tourism in Conwy County Borough
Tourism in Gwynedd
Tourism in Snowdonia